Alteromonas addita is a marine bacterium.

External links

Type strain of Alteromonas addita at BacDive -  the Bacterial Diversity Metadatabase

Alteromonadales
Bacteria described in 2005